The Renfe Class 350 is a series of four single-cabin diesel locomotives that were delivered to Spain in 1950 for use with Talgo II coaches, being built in the United States by the American Car & Foundry to a distinctly American external style.

Operations
The locomotives worked passenger services with Talgo II coaches in red lined silver Talgo II livery, starting in 1950 between Madrid and Hendaye and ending in 1972 with trains between Madrid and Palencia.

When the Talgo II coaches were withdrawn the locomotives were formed into two pairs, and worked Talgo III services between Madrid and Bilbao on the Miranda de Ebro-Bilbao until 1976 when that service was taken over by Renfe Class 269 locomotives.

Fleet details
Like all Talgo locomotives, the Class 350 received names.

References

External links

350
B-B locomotives
Talgo
Diesel locomotives of Spain
5 ft 6 in gauge locomotives
Railway locomotives introduced in 1949
Passenger locomotives 
Streamlined diesel locomotives